James Latham McDiarmid Clyde, Lord Clyde,  (30 October 1898 – 30 June 1975) was a Scottish Unionist politician and judge.

Life 
Born on 30 October 1898 at Heriot Row, Edinburgh, Clyde was the eldest son of Anna Margaret McDiarmid (d. 1956), (daughter of Professor Peter Wallwork Latham of Cambridge) and James Avon Clyde, Lord Clyde. He was educated at Edinburgh Academy, Trinity College, Oxford and the University of Edinburgh, and was admitted as an advocate in 1924 and as a King's Counsel in 1936.

He was an unsuccessful parliamentary candidate for Midlothian South and Peebles at the 1945 general election, and was elected as Member of Parliament for Edinburgh North at the 1950 election, holding the seat until December 1954.

He was appointed a Privy Counsellor and Lord Advocate in 1951, and in 1954 was raised to the bench as Lord President, with the judicial title Lord Clyde. He held this office until 1972.
His father had previously also served as Lord Advocate and Lord President.

His son, James Clyde, Baron Clyde became a member of the Court of Session and latterly a Law Lord.

Sources 

Who Was Who

References

External links 
 

1898 births
1975 deaths
People educated at Edinburgh Academy
Members of the Parliament of the United Kingdom for Edinburgh constituencies
Clyde
Unionist Party (Scotland) MPs
Members of the Privy Council of the United Kingdom
UK MPs 1950–1951
UK MPs 1951–1955
Lords President of the Court of Session
Lords Justice-General
Lord Advocates
Alumni of the University of Edinburgh
Ministers in the third Churchill government, 1951–1955